Clostera apicalis, the apical prominent or red-marked tentmaker, is a species of moth in the family Notodontidae (the prominents). It was first described by Francis Walker in 1855 and it is found in North America.

The MONA or Hodges number for Clostera apicalis is 7901.

Subspecies
Two subspecies belong to Clostera apicalis:
 Clostera apicalis apicalis (Walker, 1855) i g
 Clostera apicalis ornata (Grote and Robinson, 1868) i c g
Data sources: i = ITIS, c = Catalogue of Life, g = GBIF, b = BugGuide

References

Further reading

 
 
 

Notodontidae
Articles created by Qbugbot
Moths described in 1855